Peschanoye is a rural locality (a selo) in Parfyonovsky Selsoviet, Topchikhinsky District, Altai Krai, Russia. The population was 340 as of 2013. There are 5 streets.

Geography 
Peschanoye is located on the Peschanoye Lake, 46 km west of Topchikha (the district's administrative centre) by road. Parfyonovo is the nearest rural locality.

References 

Rural localities in Topchikhinsky District